Odd Eidem (23 October 1913 – 10 June 1988) was a Norwegian writer, journalist and literary critic.

Biography
He was born in Kristiania (now Oslo), Norway. He was the eldest of three sons born to Gunnar Kølbel (1890–1963) and Dorothea Serine Eidem (1889–1940). His parents divorced during his youth. He grew up in Hamar and received his artium in 1931. He earned a master's degree in literature history at the University of Oslo in 1938.

He debuted in 1939 as a fiction author. During the 1930s, he was an active member of the political movement Mot Dag.
He worked as a secretary for Nansenhjelpen from 1938 to 1940. 
After World War II, Eidem became a literary critic at Verdens Gang, where he remained a regular contributor until 1977.
From 1955 to 1977, he also wrote theater reviews.
He wrote a column for Aftenposten from 1978 to 1988. 
His performances on radio can be heard on the CD collection Hørøretøret from the Gunnar Haugan NRK radio program Hørøret.

Eidem was awarded the Norwegian Critics Prize for Literature (Kritikerprisen) in 1978 for the flaneries, Cruise. He received the Cappelen Prize (Cappelenprisen) in 1980.

Selected works
Uten fane, 1939
Kala, 1971
Cruise, 1978
Pieter og jeg, 1979
Ute på veiene, 1980
Morgen i Dibonne. Et landsbybilde, 1982
Arons roser, 1985

Awards 
Riksmål Society Literature Prize, 1960
Norwegian Booksellers' Prize, 1968
Norwegian Critics Prize for Literature, 1978

References

1913 births
1988 deaths
Writers from Oslo
Norwegian columnists
Norwegian literary critics
Norwegian theatre critics
Norwegian writers
Mot Dag
20th-century Norwegian writers
20th-century Norwegian journalists